Abbey Park High School, commonly referred to as APHS, is a secondary school located in the town of Oakville, Ontario in the Greater Toronto Area. Abbey Park High School was opened at its present location in the wake of the closure of Queen Elizabeth Park High School, which was previously operating at its Bridge Road location, in Bronte. Abbey Park has more resources available to its students than other schools in the region because it inherited Queen Elizabeth Park's resources when it was closed. This allowed for the initial opening budget to be spent on new equipment. Students have open access to a weight room, home economics kitchen, library, and track. Abbey Park High School is also situated beside the Glen Abbey Community Centre, which houses the Glen Abbey branch of the Oakville Public Library.

Academics

Academically, Abbey Park is among the strongest secondary schools in Ontario ranking 10th overall and first in Oakville. Abbey Park offers a variety of enrichment programs such as the Cluster Program for high achieving students, two Specialist High Skills Major (SHSM) programs for business and the social sciences as well as an Ontario Youth Apprenticeship Program (OYAP) for fashion. Recently, Abbey Park began offering the Advanced Placement Calculus, Advanced Placement Biology and Advanced Placement Statistics courses. Abbey Park students continue to succeed in math competitions often earning regional, provincial and national recognition; Abbey Park ranked number two in Oakville, in its math contests performance in the year 2011–2012.

Abbey Park students have also been very successful in the Bay Area Science And Engineering Fair (BASEF) interregional competition. In 2010, a student from Abbey Park won second best in fair and progressed to Intel's International Science and Engineering Fair (ISEF). In 2012, two Abbey Park students progressed to ISEF, one of whom won the best in fair award. In 2013, one Abbey Park student progressed to ISEF and won second best in fair. In 2014, two Abbey Park students won gold merit awards and progressed to Canada Wide Science Fair (CWSF). In 2020, one Abbey Park student won a silver merit award and progressed to CWSF.

Arts

Drama

The dramatic arts program at Abbey Park attracts many students to participate in its clubs and productions.

Every year, Abbey Park organizes a team to compete in the Canadian Improv Games, a national tournament for high school improv.  Abbey Park's teams have been consistently strong over the years, and won the silver medal at the 2009 National Tournament, placing 15th nationally in 2008.

Scripted dramatic productions are also very popular at Abbey Park. Each November, Abbey Park puts on a dramatic production (known as Fall Production within the school). A group of less formal productions are organized in the spring for Abbey Park's Show of Hands Drama Festival, where any group of students may perform.

Music

Abbey Park has several different bands that perform at various shows throughout the year:
 Junior Music Band, consisting of grade 9 students,
 Senior Music Band, consisting of students from grades 10, 11 and 12,
 Jazz Band, consisting of students who have successfully completed an audition early in the school year, and
 Ska Band, a small student-organized band.

Visual

Abbey Park has an Arts Club that any student is welcome to join. The club meets on a weekly basis throughout the year and focuses on creating visual art pieces for portfolios of students intending to apply to a post-secondary program where a portfolio of artwork is necessary.

Sports

Cheerleading

Abbey Park's cheerleading team competes in the large Senior Advanced All-Girl division, which is the highest possible division for high school teams. The team won the titles of Regional, Provincial and National Champions in 2010. In 2011, the team has placed first at Regionals, Provincials and Nationals. They also won the award for "Top Team Tumbling" at both the 2010 and 2011 Nationals. The team also won Provincial and National Champions in 2012, making this their third year in a row undefeated.

Girls rugby

Abbey Park started a Varsity Girls Rugby team in the 2009 season. A stunningly impressive first season led the girls to victories in tournaments and against rivals Blakelock High School and Loyola Catholic School. Many players continued on to lead the team to an impressive second year, reaching the Halton Finals. Many girls have since gone onto play for universities across Canada as well as Rugby Canada Junior teams. In 2012, the Abbey Park Varsity Girls Rugby team were the tier 2 Halton Champions.

Basketball

Boys and Girls Eagles Basketball teams compete in the Halton Secondary School Athletic Association (HSSAA). The Midget Boys basketball team won the Halton Region Championship in the school's first season in 2005.

Boys Rugby

The boys rugby program was established in 2005 by coach and local rugby notable, Tyler Leggatt. Tyler Leggatt rose to prominence as a player with the Oakville Crusaders in the early 2000s. He later represented Ontario Senior Men's team as a member of the President's XV, as well as the Niagara Thunder in the Rugby Canada Super League. The program fields bantam, junior and senior sides.

Championships 
Since the program's inception in 2005, Abbey Park has competed in nearly every Halton Tier One Senior boys, missing out on two (2013 and 2019). The Senior Boys rugby team has won the GHAC Regional title four times: 2010 and 2011 as a AAA/AAAA program and again in 2015 and 2016 twice as a A/AA program. Abbey Park's senior boys have competed at AAA/AAAA OFSAA in 2011 where they finished 4th after being defeated by Oakville Trafalgar in the 3rd place match.  More recently, the AP Senior Boys have competed in the A/AA OFSAA Rugby Championships in 2015 and 2016, finishing 6th and 9th respectively.

National Team Selections 
Many young Eagles have gone on to represent Ontario at the National Rugby Festival in the past, and five former players have gone on to play for Canada at the junior age grade: Djustice Sears-Duru, Chris Woodhead, and Sawyer Herron, and more recently, Aidan Foley.  Djustice is a current member of Rugby Canada's National Senior Men's team and plays professionally with the Los Angeles Giltinis in the North American professional rugby league, the MLR.  Djustice is not the only Abbey Park Eagle to play professional rugby, Jamie Leveridge played two seasons with the Toronto Arrows (2019-20).

Varsity Lacrosse

Abbey Park started a Varsity Boys Lacrosse team in the 2012 season. In the OFSAA qualifiers Abbey Park had a record of 1–2 defeating the defending champions Notre Dame but losing to Corpus Christi and school rival Loyola ended Abbey Parks chances to qualify for OFSAA. Abbey Park had a record of 3-8 for the season.
Restarting in 2015/2016, Abbey park has qualified for OFSAA and medaled every year; Gold (2016/2017), Bronze (2015/2016, 2016/2017). Abbey Park has only lost one game in both the 2015/2016 and 2016/2017 season, defeating rivals Holy Trinity each year.

Councils

Abbey Park has several student-body councils for different areas of interest. The Arts Council plans art-related events, the Student Government plans events such as Coffee House and Pasta Night, the Environmental Council is committed to improving the quality of the environment in and around the school and the Social Council tackles and raises awareness of worldwide social problems. Abbey Park's Executive Council is a meta-council consisting of leaders from all councils & clubs. The Executive Council meets semi-annually. The Ontario Organization of Secondary Students (OOSS) began at Abbey Park and has extended to various schools in the Halton and Peel region.

Clubs

Tutoring Club

Abbey Park's Tutoring Club, founded in 2011, provides tutoring and mentorship services to students from Abbey Park and its surrounding community. The leadership roles are split according to various subjects; there are directors of math, sciences and languages who coordinate individual workshops ahead of tests and exams.

Eagle Ink

The Eagle Ink (previously named Quill) is Abbey Park's school magazine. Any student can join as a writer, editor, photographer or layout designer. The magazine is published semi-annually at the end of each semester.

Young Women In Leadership

Young Women in Leadership is a group for young women in the school that discusses issues young women face to promote awareness.

DECA

The business department at Abbey Park runs a  DECA chapter for the school. Abbey Park competes at DECA Ontario's Hamilton Regional Competition in November, and a large percentage of competitors move on to the provincial competition in February in Toronto.

Debate Team

Abbey Park's Debate Team seeks to improve students' public speaking skills and ability to logically organize ideas. The club follows both the Canadian National Debate Format and the British Parliamentary Style for formal debates. Abbey Park's Debate Team had been regionally successful,  and has won many interscholastic debates.

Math Society

Abbey Park Math Society is composed of ambitious students who aspire to do better in numerous mathematical contests offered throughout the year. Math Society meets every week to refresh the members of common mathematical concepts that appear in the contests and how to attack those problems in a more time-efficient manner.

Notable alumni
 Steve Mason – NHL rookie of the year 2008–09
 Alice Moran – Star of City TV's Sunnyside and Canadian Screen Award winner.
 Stuart Percy  –  National Hockey League Toronto Maple Leafs First round Draft pick 2011 (25th overall)

See also
List of high schools in Ontario

References

External links
 Official website

High schools in Oakville, Ontario
2004 establishments in Ontario
Educational institutions established in 2004